Radica Dukova (born 2 February 1992) is a Macedonian footballer who plays as a midfielder for the North Macedonia national team.

International career
Dukova made her debut for the North Macedonia national team on 25 October 2009, coming on as a substitute for Afrodita Salihi against Belarus.

References

1992 births
Living people
Women's association football midfielders
Macedonian women's footballers
North Macedonia women's international footballers